= Bill Milbrodt =

Composer and creator of Car Music Project

Bill Milbrodt is a composer and creator of the Car Music Project, a band that plays music on instruments made from car parts. The instruments have names like "exhaustaphone", "tank bass", "doorimba", "tube flute", and "percarsion". The band plays music that is written by Milbrodt and also does improvising in which the written music is played by some members of the band while other members improvise, sometimes several at one time.

Milbrodt won an Emmy Award in New York City for a 1991 musical score he composed electronically for a short avant-garde video called "American Venus". He made his living mainly as a composer of music for commercial purposes, and as a sound designer, and did occasional performances for the Car Music Project. In 2005 he formed an ensemble called "The Car Music Project", with regular members/sidemen, for the purpose of performing on a regular basis.

Milbrodt is a self-taught composer. He studied Film Production at the New York University Film School, and graduated in 1977. He refers to some of his compositions as "sonic pantomimes".

== Car Music Project ==
The Car Music Project is both the name of a project and the name of a band conceived and led by American composer Milbrodt. The band—a live performance and recording ensemble—is part of the project. The project began in 1995 as an attempt by Milbrodt to "turn a car into music that can be expressed in written form and, therefore, performed and interpreted by more than one musician or group of musicians." More specifically, Milbrodt wanted playable musical instruments created from his own car, and wanted them to represent the four instrument families of the traditional orchestra: winds, brass, percussion, and strings. To accomplish his goal, he hired professional auto mechanics to disassemble his car, and commissioned metal sculptor Ray Faunce III to create a series of playable musical instruments from the car's parts. Faunce worked with a team that included musicians, an engineer, a physicist, a glass cutter, and others to create a series of instruments, which were given names like Convertibles and Tube Flutes (winds), Strutbone and Exhaustaphone (brass), Percarsion (percussion, of course), and Tank Bass and Air Guitar (strings).

=== Band ===
The band in its present form as an ongoing ensemble called the "Car Music Project" was started by Milbrodt in early 2005. (Previously, Milbrodt and individual members of the current ensemble had performed in an ad hoc fashion, pulling the musicians together for rehearsal when the need arose.) The members of the Car Music Project include Eric Haltmeier on reed and non-reed instruments classified as "winds", James Spotto on instruments classified as "brass", William Trigg on Percarsion, and Wilbo Wright and Milbrodt on strings. The band's leader and composer is Milbrodt. The Car Music Project performed several concerts in 2005, culminating with a performance at the Philadelphia Live Arts & Fringe Festival.
